Sesniki   is a village in Setomaa Parish, Võru County in southeastern Estonia.

Sesniki and its neighbouring villages (Kundruse, Litvina, Pattina, Perdaku, Saabolda, Saatse, Samarina and Ulitina) are notable as part of Estonia that, although not an enclave, was not accessible by road before 2008 without passing through Russian territory for several hundred metres, through an area known as the Saatse Boot. In 2008 a new Matsuri–Sesniki road was opened, making it possible to reach the area without necessarily passing through the Saatse Boot. This is, however, a 15–20 km detour if traveling from Värska.

References

 

Villages in Võru County
Estonia–Russia border crossings